The Interactive Pager was an early messaging device created in 1996 by Research In Motion (the maker of Blackberries). It allowed people to send and receive messages through a wireless network, and it also had a traditional pager system. The Interactive Pager was named the Top Product of 1997 by Wireless for the Corporate User Magazine.

The device is credited for rolling out then-new features such as peer-to-peer delivery and read receipts, sending faxes to phones, and text to speech technology. 

In August 1998, BellSouth Wireless Data replaced the RIM-900 with the RIM 950 and marketed the service as BellSouth Interactive Paging(sm).

The Inter@ctive Pager, introduced in 1996 by Research In Motion (later known for the Blackberry line of messaging devices), allowed users to receive and send messages over the internet via a wireless data network known as Mobitex.  The US Operator of Mobitex, RAM Mobile Data operated the network and introduced the Inter@ctive Pager service as RAMfirst Interactive PagingSM. The product was named the 1997 Top Product by Wireless for the Corporate User Magazine. The Inter@ctive Pager was also known as the RIM-900.

References

External links
Interactive Messaging Plus User's Guide

Pagers
Information appliances
BlackBerry Limited
Products introduced in 1996